Crosby High School is a public high school in Crosby, a community in unincorporated Harris County, Texas. Approximately 1,600 students are enrolled in grades 9 through 12.

Crosby High School is located off FM 2100, approximately 35 miles northeast of Downtown Houston. It serves the Crosby Independent School District. Crosby ISD built a new high school campus that opened fall of 2016. Current administration includes Principal Terry Perkins.

The school serves the census-designated places of Crosby and Barrett.

History

On September 18, 1991, 17-year-old Arthur Jermel Jack was killed by 15-year-old LaKeeta Cadoree, in the cafeteria. Cadoree, still holding the gun, went to the school's office, called her mother, and asked to be taken home. Cadoree then "broke down", according to the Associated Press. The school's assistant principal was able to calm her down and convince her to surrender her weapon. She was arrested, tried, and convicted for Jack's murder and was released after serving 22 years in prison.
In 2000 Rudolph Thomas, the principal, resigned from his position. Deborah Frank, an assistant principal, became the new principal.

Football is high on the list of priorities at Crosby High School.  This is evidenced by the fact that the head football coach, Jeff Riordan, is paid more than the principal.  Jeff Riordan's salary was $117,896, while the principal's (Terry Perkins) salary was only $113,000.

Academics
2011 School Accountability Rating: Met standard. Although Crosby High School met the existing 2016 standard, under the new Texas Education Agency letter grade rankings set to debut in 2018, Crosby High School received 3 - D's and 1 - F in the following areas, Student Achievement (D), Student Progress (D), Closing Performance Gaps (D) and Postsecondary Readiness (F).

Dual credit classes
Dual credit classes with San Jacinto College North and Lee College.

Dual credit programs: CTE (Career and Technology Education), MECA (Modified Early College Academy), professional certifications.

Sports
District 5A
Baseball
Basketball
Cross-country
Football
Golf
swimming
Powerlifting
Soccer
Softball
Tennis
Track
Volleyball

Notable alumni
J. R. Towles: Houston Astros catcher
Leo Rucka: played as center and linebacker for the San Francisco 49ers in 1956. Drafted in the second round in the 1954 NFL Draft

References

External links

Public high schools in Harris County, Texas